Queipo is a surname. Notable people with the surname include:

Francisco de Borja Queipo de Llano, 8th Count of Toreno (1840–1890), Spanish noble and politician
Gonzalo Queipo de Llano (1875–1951), Spanish Army Officer who fought for the Nationalists during the Spanish Civil War
José María Queipo de Llano Ruiz de Saravia, 7th Count of Toreno (1786–1843), 19th-century Spanish politician and historian
Manuel Abad y Queipo (1751–1825), Spanish Roman Catholic bishop of Valladolid